The Battle of Nantes was a battle between Royalist and Republican French forces at Nantes on 29 June 1793 during the War in the Vendée.  It consisted of the siege of that town, and was a Republican victory.  Louis Marie Turreau wrote of it:

Historical context
The Battle of Nantes was one in a series of battles during the War in the Vendee, which was a counterrevolution in the French province of Vendee against the French revolutionaries and lasted from 1793 to 1796. It was one encounter in many between the Vendee rebels and republican troops sent to crush the

Battle

Reasons for the Royalist defeat

Bibliography
"Une famille Vendéenne pendant la Grande Guerre", by Boutillier de Saint-André
"Monsieur de Charette chevalier du Roi", by Michel de Saint-Pierre
"Mémoires pour servir à l'histoire de la guerre de la Vendée", by Général Turreau
"Les Guerres de Vendée", by Emile Gabory
Thanks to Christine Duranteau, whose article in Royet is (with her friendly permission) the basis for this article.
History of the Vendée

Battles involving France
Conflicts in 1793
Battles of the War in the Vendée
Battles in Pays de la Loire
History of Loire-Atlantique
1793 in France